Varella is a surname. Notable people with the surname include:

 Dora Varella (born 2001), Brazilian professional skateboarder
 Drauzio Varella (born 1943), Brazilian doctor, educator, scientist, medical science popularizer, and author